Casper D. Waller (May 20, 1892 – March 6, 1959) was a member of the Wisconsin State Assembly.

Biography
Waller was born on May 20, 1892, in Hixton, Wisconsin. He graduated from the School of the Art Institute of Chicago in 1914 and resided in Black River Falls, Wisconsin, where he worked as a salesman. He died of a heart attack in Black River Falls in 1959.

Career
Waller was a member of the Assembly during the 1943, 1945, 1947 and 1949 sessions. Previously, he had been Register of Deeds of Jackson County, Wisconsin from 1936 to 1942. He was affiliated with the Wisconsin Progressive Party. Waller also worked as a cartoonist for the Republican Party.

References

External links

People from Black River Falls, Wisconsin
Members of the Wisconsin State Assembly
Wisconsin Progressives (1924)
20th-century American politicians
Artists from Wisconsin
20th-century American artists
American cartoonists
School of the Art Institute of Chicago alumni
1892 births
1959 deaths
People from Jackson County, Wisconsin